Henrietta was a 19th-century wooden yacht schooner, designed and built in 1861 by Henry Steers for James Gordon Bennett Jr. She was acquired by the Union Navy during the American Civil War. She was placed into the U.S. Revenue Service assigned to support the fleet blockading the ports of the Confederate States of America. The Henrietta won the first mid-winter transatlantic yacht race across the Atlantic between three American yachts.

Construction and service 

Schooner Yacht Henrietta was launched from the shipyard of Henry Steers at Greenpoint, Brooklyn on May 18, 1861. She was designed and built by Henry Steers for James Gordon Bennett Jr. as a pleasure yacht. She was modelled by William Tooker as a keel yacht of 205 tons.

Purchased by US Navy 

In 1861, Bennett volunteered his newly built yacht Henrietta for the U.S. Revenue Marine Service during the Civil War. At the same time, Bennett was commissioned as a third lieutenant in the Revenue Marine Service and assigned to the U.S. Henrietta. She patrolled Long Island looking for rebels until February 1862 when she was sent to Port Royal, South Carolina. She carried a 24-pound Dahlgren gun with 16 men. On March 3, 1862, Bennett commanded the Henrietta as part of the fleet which captured Fernandina, Florida and raised the American flag. Bennett and the Henrietta was decommissioned and returned to civilian life in New York in May 1862.

In September 1865, the Henrietta lost to the yacht Fleetwing in a race around Cape May Lightship by 1 hour and 19 minutes. In October 1865, she was defeated by the Vesta over the same course.

Transatlantic race

In what was billed as the "Great Ocean Yacht Race", when three wealthy American men took their yachts on a mid-winter transatlantic race across the Atlantic in December 1866. The three yachts were the Vesta owned by Pierre Lorillard IV, the Fleetwing owned by George and Franklin Osgood and the Henrietta owned by the 21-year-old yachtsman James Gordon Bennett Jr. Each yachtsman put up $30,000 in the winner-take-all wager. They started from Sandy Hook Light, during high westerly winds and raced to The Needles, the furthest westerly point of the Isle of Wight in the English Channel, before reaching the seaport Cowes on the Isle of Wight. Bennett's Henrietta won with a time of 13 days, 21 hours, 55 minutes, with Captain Samuel S. Samuels as the skipper. The Fleetwing and Vesta took over 14 days to reach Cowes. After his win, Bennett bought the rival yacht, the Fleetwing, for $65,000 and named her the Dauntless.

After the race, on January 1, 1867, Commodore McVickar of the New York Yacht Club and Mr. Bennett, of the Henrietta had a personal meeting with Queen Victoria at Osborne House.

End of service

In 1870, the Henrietta was sold for $16,000 to Captain Nickerson of Boston for fruit trade in West Indies. She was later sold again and used in the African trade and then transferred to New Orleans and the Bay Island Fruit company.

On December 16, 1872, the Henrietta was lost off the coast of Roatán, Honduras on her return voyage to New York during a heavy gale. Her crew were saved.

References 

Ships of the Union Navy
Schooners of the United States
Schooners of the United States Navy
Gunboats of the United States Navy
Dispatch boats of the United States Navy
American Civil War patrol vessels of the United States
Individual sailing vessels
Service vessels of the United States
1861 ships
Maritime incidents in December 1872